Virginius may refer to:

Virginius Affair, a diplomatic dispute that occurred during the Ten Years' War
, the ship at the center of the Affair
Virginius Island, West Virginia, an island on the Shenandoah River in Harpers Ferry, West Virginia

People 
Alan Virginius (born 2003), French footballer
Any of various members of the Roman gens Verginia, also spelled Virginia
Virginius E. Clark (1886–1948), American aviator and military officer
Virginius Dabney (1901–1995), American educator and writer
Virginius Dabney (American football) (1878–1942), football player and coach

Literature 
 Virginius (play), an 1820 tragedy by James Sheridan Knowles 
 a character in The Physician's Tale, one of the Canterbury Tales of Geoffrey Chaucer, written in the 14th century
Lucius Verginius, a respected Roman centurion and father of Roman heroine Verginia in Livy's Ab Urbe Condita

See also

 Virginia (given name), a feminine name derived from the Roman gens
 Virginianus (disambiguation), a Latin term in taxonomy meaning "of Virginia"